The  is a museum run by the soy sauce manufacturer Kikkoman inside its factory near Nodashi Station in Noda, Chiba, Japan.

The museum offers soy sauce production process information and the history of soy sauce, as well as factory tours. An offsite stockhouse is also available for viewing. The separate city museum also has soy sauce tools on display.

References

External links
 Company virtual museum

Museums in Chiba Prefecture
Food museums in Japan
Noda, Chiba